
Galdo (or also Galdi), may refer to:

Places

Italy
Municipalities (comuni)
San Bartolomeo in Galdo, in the Province of Benevento
San Giovanni in Galdo, in the Province of Campobasso

Civil parishes (frazioni)
Galdo, in the municipality of Campagna (SA)
Galdo, in the municipality of Pollica (SA)
Galdo degli Alburni, former municipality now part of Sicignano degli Alburni (SA)
Galdo di Carifi, in the municipality of Mercato San Severino (SA)
Montegaldo, in the municipality of Lauria (PZ)
Piazza del Galdo, in the municipality of Mercato San Severino (SA)

Elsewhere
Galdi, Cameroon

People
Vincenzo Galdi, Italian photographer
Antonio Galdo, Italian journalist
Brendan Galdo, American musician